Gabriel Alejandro Vargas Venegas (born 8 December 1983), known as Gabriel Vargas, is a Chilean footballer, who currently plays as striker for Deportes Concepción in the Segunda División Profesional de Chile.

Club career
He began on the youth squad of Deportes Concepción and debuted in 2002. After he was released in 2005, he moved to Norway to work as a stevedor, at the same time he played for Norwegian Third Division club Andes. In 2006, he played for Puerto Montt.  In 2007, Vargas played for Cobresal where he was one of the team's leading goal scorers for the year.  In the 2007 Clausura tournament, Vargas scored 11 goals.

In 2008, he moved to Universidad de Concepción. Then he moved to Universidad de Chile, to play 2010 Apertura and 2010 Copa Libertadores.

Personal life
He is nicknamed El Arcángel del Gol (The Goal Archangel) due to the fact that his name is Gabriel just like the biblical character.

Honours

Club
Universidad de Concepción
 Copa Chile (1): 2008-09
 Primera B (1): 2013

Universidad de Chile
 Primera División de Chile (2): 2011 Apertura, 2011 Clausura
 Copa Sudamericana (1): 2011

Notes

References

External links
 
 

1983 births
Living people
Sportspeople from Concepción, Chile
Chilean footballers
Chilean expatriate footballers
Deportes Concepción (Chile) footballers
Puerto Montt footballers
Cobresal footballers
Universidad de Concepción footballers
Universidad de Chile footballers
Club Atlético Patronato footballers
Curicó Unido footballers
Chilean Primera División players
Norwegian Third Division players
Primera B de Chile players
Argentine Primera División players
Segunda División Profesional de Chile players
Expatriate footballers in Norway
Chilean expatriate sportspeople in Norway
Expatriate footballers in Argentina
Chilean expatriate sportspeople in Argentina
Association football forwards